Pleurotomella endeavourensis is a species of sea snail, a marine gastropod mollusk in the family Raphitomidae.

Description
The length of the shell attains 10.9 mm.

Distribution
This species occurs in the Ross Sea, Antarctica.

References

 Dell, Richard Kenneth. "Antarctic Mollusca: with special reference to the fauna of the Ross Sea." Royal Society of New Zealand, 1990.

External links
 Kantor Y.I., Harasewych M.G. & Puillandre N. (2016). A critical review of Antarctic Conoidea (Neogastropoda). Molluscan Research. 36(3): 153-206
 

endeavourensis
Gastropods described in 1990